Skyscraper is a roller coaster concept originally planned for a future Skyplex entertainment complex located in Orlando, Florida. Development began in 2012 by American manufacturer US Thrill Rides and Swiss manufacturer Intamin, with both companies designing the attraction as the first Polercoaster model utilizing an observation tower for its main support structure. Developers expected to complete the work by 2016, but a number of delays resulted in the date being pushed back several times. The status of the project became uncertain in 2019, following the removal of the project's website and lack of updates from developers.

History
In 2012, Wallack Holdings, owners of Mango's Tropical Café in Orlando, selected the Polercoaster design concept pitched by US Thrill Rides to become their flagship attraction at the future-planned Skyplex indoor entertainment complex. After several successful negotiations for land, the development of both the roller coaster and Skyplex began. In May 2014, investment for the project was sought, and a website was formed to assist with the endeavor. Documents uncovered by an Orlando news agency revealed that the roller coaster would be located in Central Florida along International Drive at the intersection with Sand Lake Road.

The skyscraper was officially announced on June 5, 2014. Construction on the main complex was expected to begin in 2015, with the ride opening in 2016. However, design changes and a lengthy process for obtaining the necessary permits caused several delays in breaking ground, and the timeline was updated to reflect construction on the complex beginning in mid-2017. The addition of virtual reality headsets to Skyscraper was announced in late 2016, and the expected opening date was updated to 2019. By April 2017, portions of the roller coaster's track had been completed by Intamin and were placed in storage, but construction of the complex was still on hold pending permit approval.

In January 2019, Skyplex's budget was scaled back from $500 million to $251 million, with plans to retain Skyscraper's original coaster design but include less retail development around the base of the structure. The complex's projected opening date was pushed back further to 2020, with rides opening sometime later. By June 2019, the website promoting the project was taken down, and reports surfaced in 2020 that Universal used a variety of legal tactics to derail the project. The last update from the developers on Facebook was in December 2017, and their Twitter feed went dormant two years earlier.

In January 2019, it was announced that the Skyplex project as a whole had been scaled back, but that the size of the tower and 2020 opening date would remain unchanged. The project was later removed from Mango's Tropical Cafe's website in June 2019. In 2021, Joshuah Wallack revealed that Wallack Holdings had signed a licensing deal with Lionsgate Entertainment to open Skyplex as a Lionsgate Entertainment World resort, centered around the Skyscraper roller coaster, but that the project had lost its financing in early 2020 as theme parks in Florida were being forced to closed due to the COVID-19 pandemic. As of late 2021, Wallack Holdings still held the licensing deal and Joshua Wallack said that while he still wanted to build a roller coaster on the property, practical considerations had him considering other uses for the site such as a resort hotel to support the nearby upcoming Universal's Epic Universe theme park. On December 21, 2022, US Thrill Rides and Polercoaster LLC, the companies behind the project, filed for Chapter 11 bankruptcy.

Characteristics
Wrapping around the central tower, the roller coaster would feature seven inversions including zero-g rolls and raven turns. If it were to be completed, Skyscraper would operate with several small trains. Each train would have two rows that seat four riders each for a total of eight riders per train. The ride was expected to accommodate a theoretical capacity of 1000 riders per hour. Each seat would feature a lap restraint as opposed to over-the-shoulder harnesses to avoid obstructing the view. Skyscraper would be 35 meters (114 feet) taller than the current world record holder, Kingda Ka, which opened at Six Flags Great Adventure in 2005.

Records
If completed, Skyscraper would break several world records upon opening. With a structure exceeding  in height, it would break Kingda Ka's  height record and become the world's tallest roller coaster. Skyscraper would also have an inversion near the highest point of the ride, breaking Steel Curtain's  record for the highest inversion in the world, set at Kennywood in 2019. Another planned feature, a 123-degree drop, would give it the steepest drop in the world, exceeding the 121.5-degree drop of TMNT Shellraiser, which opened at Nickelodeon Universe in 2019.

References

Roller coasters under construction
Proposed skyscrapers in the United States
Roller coasters in Orlando, Florida
Companies that filed for Chapter 11 bankruptcy in 2022